Sahk may refer to:
Tõnis Sahk (b. 1983), Estonian long jumper
Sahk, Iran, a village in South Khorasan Province, Iran

See also
SAHK, Scout Association of Hong Kong